Bathurst Street is a main north–south thoroughfare in Toronto, Ontario, Canada. It begins at an intersection of the Queens Quay roadway, just north of the Lake Ontario shoreline. It continues north through Toronto to the Toronto boundary at Steeles Avenue. It is a four-lane thoroughfare throughout Toronto. The roadway continues north into York Region where it is known as York Regional Road 38.

Route description
Bathurst Street begins in the south at the intersection with Queens Quay. The southernmost part of Bathurst, south of the Gardiner Expressway, was heavily industrialized until the 1970s. These factories are now gone; in their place, some residential development has occurred, including the extended Queen's Quay. The former Omni Television headquarters are in this area, before they relocated in October 2008 but Rogers Media still owns the building. South of the intersection, Eireann Quay, which used to be a section of Bathurst Street, runs south to the Billy Bishop Toronto City Airport ferry dock and the Western Gap channel which separates the Toronto Islands from the Toronto mainland.

North of the Gardiner is Fort York on the western side. The Sir Isaac Brock Bridge connects the section south of Fort York to the section north of the railways. The bridge was relocated here in 1916. It had been used as a railway bridge over the Humber River. North of the tracks, the area is a mix of small commercial and residential buildings on the western fringe of downtown.  North of Queen Street, the eastern side of Bathurst is the edge of the Alexandria Park cluster of housing projects, while to the west is Trinity–Bellwoods. North of Dundas Street, Bathurst is dominated by Toronto Western Hospital. This part of the street continues to be a mix of small commercial establishments and residential housing, generally rental apartments.

North of College Street, Bathurst becomes more residential, with the exception of certain areas, chiefly around the intersections with Bloor Street, St. Clair Avenue, and Eglinton Avenue. The portion of Bathurst Street north of Bloor Street is the western boundary of The Annex neighbourhood. 

The University segment of Toronto Transit Commission (TTC) Line 1 Yonge–University crosses underneath Bathurst north of St. Clair, with the St. Clair West station at St. Clair just east of Bathurst. North of Eglinton, the street continues as a four-lane arterial road into the former borough of North York. The street has lay-bys for TTC buses and turning lanes at intersections, expanding its width. Development along both sides of the road is both residential and commercial, with shopping plazas at many intersections. The West Branch of the Don River crosses Bathurst Street north of Sheppard and Bathurst Park (Hinder Property) is on the east side of Bathurst Street.

North of Steeles Avenue, Bathurst runs through York Region, and is also referred to as York Regional Road 38. At Steeles, Bathurst widens to become a six-lane arterial road. Bathurst Street loses 2 lanes as it passes the CN York subdivision. At Centre Street, it gains two centre bus lanes, used by VIVA Orange, which continues until Highway 7. Bathurst also widens to 6 lanes from the Highway 407 bridge before going back to 4 lanes at Autumn Hill Boulevard. Bathurst is flanked by residential subdivisions on both sides from Steeles until Elgin Mills, where then only the eastern side has residential, forming an urban-rural fringe. Bathurst continues this way for 20 km until meeting Green Lane, where it loses 2 lanes and is flanked by rural land instead. After meeting Highway 11 (York Regional Road 1), Bathurst Streets jogs for a bit until it enters Holland Landing, where it becomes a residential road. Bathurst Street loses its Regional Road status after Queensville Sideroad, where it enters the Holland Marsh. It serves as the boundary between Vaughan and Richmond Hill north of Highway 407, and between King Township and Newmarket and Aurora.

Bathurst Street ends at the Holland Marsh, between Holland Landing (in East Gwillimbury) and Bradford, with the section north of Queensville Sideroad being maintained by the Town of East Gwillimbury. It was formerly interrupted for roughly 500 m due to rugged terrain north of Morning Sideroad, north of Newmarket, but the gap was closed in 2016 when a new link was completed, allowing traffic to access York Regional Road 1 (the former Highway 11) from the sousecth. Beyond a marina on the Holland River, it continues as a private driveway to a property along the Holland Marsh. 

Old Bathurst Street runs north of St John's Sideroad to 19th Sideroad where Bathurst Street was re-routed. Another un-signed road continues slightly east from 19th Sideroad into Koffler Scientific Reserve and intersects with the current section of Bathurst south of Sykes Road.

History

The street was named for Henry Bathurst, 3rd Earl Bathurst, who organized migration from the British Isles to Canada after the War of 1812, granted the charter to King's College, and never visited Canada.

The original Bathurst Street was between Government Wharf and Queen Street, and the section to the north was called Crookshank's Lane, a semi-private lane named after George Crookshank. The intersection with Davenport was the site of Toll Gate #3 along Davenport. The tollkeeper's cottage, which was built in 1835, still exists, restored to its original appearance and is located at the north-west corner of the intersection. In 1870, Crookshank's Lane was renamed "Bathurst Street". North of Bloor, Bathurst Street was a muddy trail.

Prior to the late 1980s, the section of Bathurst St. between Centre Street and Langstaff Road/York Regional Road 7 (the latter formerly Highway 7), was a part of Highway 7, which followed it as the highway jogged between concession roads. The jog along Bathurst was eliminated when a diagonal connector was built to the west to join the two sections of the highway as a single roadway.  

Bathurst Street has finished in the top 10 in Canadian Automobile Association's "Ontario's Worst Roads" poll in every year from 2004 to 2007.

Jewish community
Bathurst Street has been the heart of the Jewish community of Toronto for decades. From the early part of the twentieth century, many Jews lived around Bathurst Street south of Bloor Street east to Spadina Avenue (and particularly Kensington Market) and west to past Christie Pits. After World War II, as the community became more middle class, it moved north along Bathurst Street, with wealthier members of the community moving to Forest Hill. Some other members moved to the area around Bathurst and St. Clair Avenue or Bathurst and Eglinton Avenue.

The community continued to move north along Bathurst and today, much of the Jewish community resides along the street from north of St. Clair Avenue and, in higher concentrations just south of Lawrence Avenue to beyond the city limits at Steeles Avenue, and extending further until about Elgin Mills Road in Richmond Hill. Many synagogues and other Jewish community institutions are on Bathurst. 

The northern stretch of Bathurst, north of Sheppard Avenue West, has become one of the centres of Toronto's Russian community. Many Russian Jewish immigrants began to settle in the area's apartment buildings (many are around the Bathurst/Sheppard intersection, and along Bathurst between Finch Avenue West and Steeles Avenue West), starting from early 1970s to get easier access to services provided by the Jewish Immigrant Aid Society. After the breakup of the Soviet Union, many Russian immigrants to Canada settled there. Many are affiliated with the Jewish Russian Community Centre. The electoral district of York Centre, which includes Bathurst from Wilson Ave. to Steeles Ave. West, has the largest number of Russian Canadian voters in Canada.  Numerous Russian delicatessens, restaurants, and book and clothing stores have earned the neighborhood the unofficial moniker "Little Moscow".

Public transit
Bathurst Station is a Toronto Transit Commission subway station at Bathurst Street and Bloor Street along Line 2 Bloor–Danforth. The 511 Bathurst streetcar route runs from Bloor to Fleet Street, where it turns to connect to Exhibition Place.
 
North of Bathurst Station, public transit is provided by two bus routes: route 7 Bathurst from Bathurst Station up to Steeles Avenue West, and 160 Bathurst North from Wilson Avenue up to New Westminster Drive and Atkinson Avenue in Vaughan. During overnight hours when the subway is closed, the bus route 307 Bathurst Blue Night covers the entire length of Bathurst within the city of Toronto.

Within Vaughan, York Region Transit runs several routes along Bathurst Street, including the 88 Bathurst from Finch Bus Terminal to Seneca College King Campus, part of Viva Orange, and other connections at the Promenade Terminal.

Points of interest
For many years, the most notable attraction on Bathurst Street was the now-demolished bargain goods emporium Honest Ed's at Bloor Street. Other landmarks along Bathurst include:

 Toronto Island Airport Ferry Terminal
 Bathurst Bowlerama (demolished)
 Bathurst Glen Golf Course
 Bathurst Station
 Sir Isaac Brock Bridge
 Bathurst Street Theatre
 The Tollkeeper's Cottage
 Baycrest Geriatric Centre
 Cedarvale Park
 Central Technical School
 Cineforum
 College Street United Church
 Earl Bales Park
 École Secondaire Catholique Renaissance
 Esther Shiner Stadium
 The Hemmingway Apartments. From 1923 to 1924, novelist Ernest Hemingway rented an apartment on Bathurst Street north of St. Clair Avenue while employed as a reporter for the Toronto Star.  A historic plaque was placed on the building by the Toronto Historical Board.
 Lawrence Manor
 Lawrence Plaza
 Little Norway Park
 North York Branson Hospital
 Richmond Hill Golf Club
 Sarah and Chaim Neuberger Holocaust Education Centre
 St. Clair West Station
 St. Michael's College School
 Promenade Shopping Centre
 Toronto Waldorf School
 Toronto Western Hospital
 Toronto Transit Commission - Hillcrest Complex
 Raoul Wallenberg Road
 Westmount Collegiate Institute

References

External links

Bathurst Street at Google Maps

Aurora, Ontario
East Gwillimbury
Transport in King, Ontario
Roads in Toronto
Transport in Newmarket, Ontario
Transport in Richmond Hill, Ontario
Transport in Vaughan
38
Jews and Judaism in Toronto
Jewish Canadian history
Jewish communities in Canada
Orthodox Jewish communities
Orthodox Judaism in Canada